The St. Lawrence Arts Center is a performing arts center and community space at 76 Congress Street in the Munjoy Hill district of Portland, Maine.  It is located in the former parish house of the St. Lawrence Church, a historic Romanesque church that was built in 1897 and demolished in 2008.  The church property was listed on the National Register of Historic Places in 1979.

Description
The St. Lawrence Arts Center stands northeast of the summit of Munjoy Hill, on the southeast side of Congress Street between Munjoy and Beckett Streets.  The center's facilities include a 110-seat theater with state-of-the art equipment.  Although the theater is used for regular theatrical productions, it is also available for other events, including private functions.

History
The local Congregationalists organized in the neighborhood 1854 to build St. Lawrence Chapel. Having outgrown that facility, the church was erected in 1897 to a design by New York City architect Arthur Jennings.  The building was unique within the state for its combination of Richardsonian Romanesque and French Chateau elements.  Maintenance suffered as the congregation dwindled in later years due to increasing costs and demographic changes; the church was added to the National Register of Historic Places in an effort to help preserve it. The congregation eventually dissolved itself in 1986 and deconsecrated the building.

The building stood empty until purchased in 1997 by the Friends of St. Lawrence Church.  The church building was demolished in 2008, and the parish hall was subsequently restored and renovated for use as a performing arts venue.

See also
National Register of Historic Places listings in Portland, Maine

References

External links

 Friends of the St. Lawrence Church official site

Churches in Portland, Maine
Congregational churches in Maine
Performing arts centers in Maine
Churches on the National Register of Historic Places in Maine
Queen Anne architecture in Maine
Churches completed in 1897
19th-century churches in the United States
1986 disestablishments in Maine
Tourist attractions in Portland, Maine
Munjoy Hill
National Register of Historic Places in Portland, Maine